Godrej Consumer Products Limited (GCPL) is an Indian consumer goods company based in Mumbai, India. GCPL's products include soap, hair colourants, toiletries and liquid detergents. Its brands include 'Cinthol', 'Godrej Fair Glow', 'Godrej No.1' and 'Godrej Shikakai' in soaps, 'Godrej Powder Hair Dye', 'Renew', 'ColourSoft' in hair colourants and 'Ezee' liquid detergent. GCPL operates several manufacturing facilities in India spread over seven locations and grouped into four operating clusters at Malanpur (Madhya Pradesh), Guwahati (Assam), Baddi- Thana (Himachal Pradesh), Baddi- Katha (Himachal Pradesh), Pondicherry, Chennai and Sikkim.

History 

The consumer products business was part of the erstwhile Godrej Soaps Limited (GSL) and was demerged into Godrej Consumer Products Limited in April 2001, pursuant to a scheme of demerger approved by the Honorable High Court of Judicature, Mumbai, dated 14 March 2001.

Acquisitions 
GCPL has bought out foreign companies such as Keyline Brands Limited (United Kingdom) in 2005, Rapidol (Pty) Limited in 2006, and Godrej Global Mid East FZE in 2007 and Argencos in Argentina, and later acquired Cosmética Nacional, a Chilean company.

In 2015, Godrej announced it had fully acquired a 100% equity stake in South African hair extensions firm Frika Hair.

Business categories 
GCPL operates in the domestic and international markets in the 'personal and household care' segment. Some of the categories are soaps, hair colourants, professional hair care products, toiletries and liquid detergents. In 2012, it made an entry into fast-growing air freshener category by launching a new fragrance product "aer" in the market.

Competition 

 In the soaps category, GCPL brands compete with Lux and Lifebuoy (Hindustan Unilever Limited).
 In the hair colours category, its products compete for market share with Black Rose, Super Vasmol and L’Oreal.
 Competitors in shaving cream category are Gillette, Palmolive and Old Spice.
 GCPL's talcum powder brands, compete with Pond's (HUL) and Denim.
 In the liquid detergent category, GCPL brands Ezee and Genteel, compete with Safewash (Wipro) and Surf Excel (HUL).

Manufacturing facilities 
GCPL operates several manufacturing facilities in India spread over seven locations and grouped into four operating clusters at Malanpur (Madhya Pradesh), Guwahati (Assam), Baddi- Thana (Himachal Pradesh), Baddi- Katha (Himachal Pradesh), Pondicherry, Chennai and Sikkim. Further, its manufacturing facilities located abroad in South Africa produce a range of personal care products and hair colour products.

Sales and distribution network 
GCPL has a widespread distribution network across India. It makes sales in both urban and rural markets, enabling it to benefit from the opportunities in both segments. It has a sales team of over 250 staff spread across the country. It has a network of 33 C&F agents and as on 29 February 2008. It had 1,247 distributors, 142 super stockists and 3,175 sub stockists to support the sales team in India. Its distributors and sub stockists cover around 650,000 retailers in India.
GCPL has linked its major distributors in India through a system called 'Sampark', a collaborative planning, forecasting and replenishment system with its ERP system leading to reduced inventory levels.

Research and development 
GCPL's R&D departments focus on developing new products, standardising new analytical methods and finding cheaper and more abundant alternatives to key raw materials. Through this research and development centre, GCPL continuously interact with consumers to obtain feedback on its products and information obtained is leveraged to complement new product development activities. The Godrej Research & Development Centre is recognised by the Department of Science and Technology, New Delhi.

Size of the company 
As of 2014, GCPL employs 21,000 employees.

References

External links
 

Manufacturing companies based in Mumbai
Indian soap brands
Personal care companies
Godrej Group
2001 establishments in Madhya Pradesh
Indian companies established in 2001
Companies listed on the National Stock Exchange of India
Companies listed on the Bombay Stock Exchange